Mars Hill Academy is a private, PK-12, classical Christian school, located in Mason, Ohio. It is a member of the Association of Classical and Christian Schools. It was established in 1996.

References

External links 
 

Christian schools in Ohio
Classical Christian schools
Elementary schools in Warren County, Ohio
High schools in Warren County, Ohio
Private elementary schools in Ohio
Private middle schools in Ohio
Private high schools in Ohio
Educational institutions established in 1996
1996 establishments in Ohio